In geometry, the truncated infinite-order triangular tiling is a uniform tiling of the hyperbolic plane with a Schläfli symbol of t{3,∞}.

Symmetry

The dual of this tiling represents the fundamental domains of *∞33 symmetry. There are no mirror removal subgroups of [(∞,3,3)], but this symmetry group can be doubled to ∞32 symmetry by adding a mirror.

Related polyhedra and tiling 

This hyperbolic tiling is topologically related as a part of sequence of uniform truncated polyhedra with vertex configurations (6.n.n), and [n,3] Coxeter group symmetry.

See also

List of uniform planar tilings
Tilings of regular polygons
Uniform tilings in hyperbolic plane

References

 John H. Conway, Heidi Burgiel, Chaim Goodman-Strass, The Symmetries of Things 2008,  (Chapter 19, The Hyperbolic Archimedean Tessellations)

External links 

Hyperbolic tilings
Infinite-order tilings
Isogonal tilings
Triangular tilings
Truncated tilings
Uniform tilings